Abhydrolase domain-containing protein 11 also known as Williams-Beuren syndrome chromosomal region 21 protein (WBSCR21) is an enzyme that in humans is encoded by the ABHD11 gene.

This gene encodes a protein containing an alpha/beta hydrolase fold domain. This gene is deleted in Williams syndrome, a multisystem developmental disorder caused by the deletion of contiguous genes at 7q11.23. Alternatively spliced transcript variants have been described, but their biological validity has not been determined.

References

External links

Further reading

EC 3.1